Buddleja davidii var. magnifica is endemic to much of the same area as the type; it was named by Rehder & E. H. Wilson in 1909.

The taxonomy of the plant and the other five davidii varieties has been challenged in recent years. Leeuwenberg sank them all as synonyms, considering them to be within the natural variation of a species, and thus unworthy of varietal recognition, a treatment adopted in the Flora of China published in 1996.

Var. magnifica was awarded the Royal Horticultural Society's First Class Certificate (FCC) in 1905.

Description
Buddleja davidii var. magnifica is chiefly distinguished by the length of its violet-purple panicles, which can reach 75  cm (very occasionally 90  cm). The plant is otherwise like the type.

Cultivation
Now very rare in cultivation, specimens are still grown in the UK, at the Royal Botanic Gardens Kew and Edinburgh. The shrub is no longer in commerce in the UK.

References

davidii
Flora of China